is a nightly Welsh language television magazine programme, formerly broadcast by S4C. Produced by Tinopolis, it was the half-hour sister programme to a full-hour .

Description
The Welsh-language television programme was first broadcast on 7 January 2002 with Angharad Mair presenting and Catrin Evans interviewing the politician Rod Richards and  questioning the Chief constable of North Wales Police at the time, Richard Brunstrom, in his first Welsh interview. It was presented by the programme's editor, Angharad Mair, and included Wales' news including leisure, entertainment and all the local events. She was joined by studio guests ranging from well-known celebrities to the up-and-coming stars of tomorrow and those with a story to tell. A team of correspondents based in Llanelli and Caernarfon reported live into the programme every night.

References

External links
Official Website

British television news shows
Welsh television news shows
Television shows set in Wales
S4C original programming
Tinopolis
2002 British television series debuts
2012 British television series endings
2000s British television series
2010s British television series
2000s Welsh television series
2010s Welsh television series